Baldock is a surname. Notable people with the surname include:

 Alex Baldock (born 1970), British businessman
 Bob Baldock (born 1937), American artist
 Bobby Baldock (born 1936), United States federal judge
Cora Baldock (born 1935), Australian-Dutch sociologist
 Darrel Baldock (1938–2011), Australian footballer
 Edward Holmes Baldock (1812–1875), MP for Shrewsbury 1847–1857
 George Baldock (born 1993), English footballer
 Jeremiah Wallace Baldock (1842–1919), American politician
 John Baldock (1915–2003), British politician
 Larry Baldock (born 1954), New Zealand politician
 Ralph Baldock (died 1313), Bishop of London from 1304
 Robert Baldock, Lord Privy Seal and Lord Chancellor of England 1320–1326
 Robert Baldock (judge) (1624/5–1691), English judge
 Sam Baldock (born 1989), English football player
 Sarah Baldock (born 1975), English organist and choral conductor
 Teddy Baldock (1907–1971), English boxer
 William Baldock (cricketer, born 1815) (1815–1878), Gentlemen of Kent cricketer
 William Baldock (Hampshire cricketer) (1847–1923), his son
 William Baldock (Somerset cricketer) (1900–1941), his son

See also
 Baldock's Mill, heritage site in Bourne, Lincolnshire
 Baldoc (disambiguation)